The 2009 Burlington mayoral election was held in March 2009 for the city of Burlington, Vermont. A few years earlier, the city had switched to holding mayoral elections every three years (e.g. the 1997 election, the 2000 election, the 2003 election, and the 2006 election), so this was the second mayoral election since the city's 2005 change to instant-runoff voting (IRV). In the 2009 election, incumbent Burlington mayor (Bob Kiss) won reelection as a member of the Vermont Progressive Party. 

Unlike in the city's first IRV mayoral election three years prior, however, Kiss was neither the plurality winner (since Republican candidate Kurt Wright won a plurality of first-place votes) nor the Condorcet winner (Democratic candidate Andy Montroll was the pairwise winner). This led to a controversy about the use of IRV in mayoral elections, culminating in a successful 2010 citizen's initiative repealing IRV's use by a vote of 52% to 48%. Ranked-choice voting would thus remain unused in Burlington until 2021, when voters again adopted IRV for all city council elections (but not mayoral ones) by a vote of 64% to 36%.

Background 

The city of Burlington, Vermont approved IRV for use in mayoral elections with a 64% vote in 2005, at a time when IRV was only used in a few local elections in the United States. The 2006 Burlington mayoral election was decided after two rounds of IRV tallying, selecting candidate Bob Kiss of the Vermont Progressive Party (VPP).  In the election, Kiss prevailed over opponents Hinda Miller, Democrat, and Kevin Curley, Republican. With his election Kiss became the second member of the VPP to be elected to the office (Peter Clavelle was the first).

Candidates
Bob Kiss (P), incumbent mayor (elected in 2006) seeking second term
 Andy Montroll (D), then current member of the Burlington City Council
 Dan Smith (I), lawyer
 James Simpson (G), owner of human-powered transportation services company in Burlington
Kurt Wright (R), then current City Councilor and State Representative

Results
Unlike Burlington's first IRV mayoral election in 2006, the mayoral race in 2009 was decided in three rounds.  Bob Kiss won the election, receiving 28.8% of the vote in the first round, and receiving 48.0% in the final round (which made up 51.5% of the ballots which had not been exhausted), defeating final challenger Kurt Wright (who received more votes than Kiss in the earlier rounds, but only received 45.2% in the final round).

The elimination rounds were as follows:

Analysis of the 2009 election 
The IRV election is considered a success by IRV advocates such as FairVote, asserting it prevented the election of the first round plurality leader by avoiding the effect of vote-splitting between the other candidates, was easy for voters to understand, avoided the need for traditional runoffs, and "contributed to producing a campaign among four serious candidates that was widely praised for its substantive nature".

Advocates of other voting reforms considered the election a failure of IRV because a 54% majority of voters preferred another specific candidate, Montroll, over the IRV winner, Kiss: The Condorcet "beats-all" winner (and likely most-approved/highest-rated candidate) did not win.  Critics claimed the system is convoluted, did nothing to increase voter turnout, turned voting into a "gambling game" due to non-monotonicity, and "eliminated the most popular moderate candidate and elected an extremist".

The IRV outcome was a result of vote-splitting: Andy Montroll defeated both Bob Kiss and Kurt Wright in separate pairwise contests, and was eliminated in the semifinal round of IRV due to vote-splitting with both candidates. Kurt Wright became the spoiler candidate (a loser whose presence in the race changed who the winner is), splitting the vote against Bob Kiss; Wright received more first-choice votes (including promoted votes to first-choice) than Montroll due to Kiss splitting the vote against Wright.

The election did demonstrate that voters are capable of using ranked-choice ballots, with 99.9% of the ballots filled out correctly, though this includes 16% of voters who bullet-voted for only one candidate.

Pairwise preference combinations:

This leads to an overall preference ranking of:

 Montroll – defeats all candidates below, including Kiss (4,064 to 3,476)
 Kiss – defeats all candidates below, including Wright (4,313 to 4,061)
 Wright – defeats all candidates below, including Smith (3,971 to 3,793)
 Smith – defeats Simpson (5,570 to 721) and the write-in candidates

Montroll was therefore preferred over Kiss by 54% of voters, preferred over Wright by 56% of voters, over Smith by 60%, and over Simpson by 91% of voters.

Hypothetical results under various voting systems 
The winner under other voting methods can be deduced, assuming voters would not employ tactical voting. In IRV, a voter never helps their preferred candidate win by withholding or falsifying their second choice. For each voting method below that elects Montroll, Kiss supporters can withhold or falsify their second choice to defeat Montroll.

Wright would have won under plurality.
 Kiss won under IRV, and would have won under a two-round system vs Wright (under Burlington's 40% threshold or the traditional 50%).
 Montroll would have won if the ballots were counted using Borda count, Bucklin, Coombs, Keener-Eigenvector, Sinkhorn, or any Condorcet method (Schulze, Ranked pairs, Copeland, etc.).

Effect on IRV in Burlington 
There was post-election controversy regarding the IRV method, and in 2010 a citizen's initiative resulted in the repeal of IRV in Burlington. The initially "stagnant" repeal campaign drew renewed interest as Kiss became embroiled in a series of controversies. In December 2009, a group called "One Person, One Vote", made up of Republicans and Democrats unhappy with the election outcome, held a press conference to announce that they had collected enough signatures for an initiative to repeal IRV. According to a local columnist, the vote was a referendum on Kiss's mayoralty; Kiss had allegedly become a "lame duck" because of a scandal relating to Burlington Telecom and other local issues. However, in an interview with Vermont Public Radio, Kiss disputed that claim, and those gathering signatures for the repeal stated that it was specifically a rejection of IRV itself.

The IRV repeal initiative in March 2010 won 52% to 48%. It earned a majority of the vote in only two of the city's seven wards, but the vote in those 2009 strongholds for Kurt Wright was lopsided against IRV. Republican Governor Jim Douglas signed the repeal into law in April 2010, saying "Voting ought to be transparent and easy to understand, and affects the will of the voters in a direct way. I'm glad the city has agreed to a more traditional process."

The repeal reverted the system back to a 40% rule that requires a top-two runoff if no candidate exceeds 40% of the vote. Had the 2009 election occurred under these rules, Kiss and Wright would have advanced to the runoff. If the same voters had participated in the runoff as in the first election and not changed their preferences, Kiss would have won the runoff.

The following decade saw continuing controversy about voting methods in Burlington. In 2011, for example, an initiative effort to increase the winning threshold from the 40% plurality to a 50% majority failed by 58.5% to 41.5%, while in 2019, instant-runoff voting was once again proposed for Burlington by Councilor Jack Hanson but went unapproved by the Charter Change Committee for the March 2020 ballot. One year later, in July 2020, the city council voted 6–5 in support of a measure to reinstate IRV, but that was vetoed by Mayor Miro Weinberger the following month. In a city election, Burlington voters voted in favor by IRV by 64% to 36% (8914 to 4918) on March 2, 2021. 
The charter change requires approval and enactment by the Vermont legislature, which did not act on it 2021.

References

External links
 City's website
 Ballot data: 2009 Mayor Reports, see 2009 Burlington Mayor Final Piles Report.txt
 Comparative visualizations of IRV, Condorcet and Borda results.

Burlington, Vermont
2009
Burlington Mayor